Cancel or cancellation may refer to:

Business 
Project cancellation, in government and industry
Cancellation (mail), a postal marking applied to a stamp or stationery indicating the item has been used
Cancellation (insurance), the termination of an insurance policy
Flight cancellation and delay, not operating a scheduled flight

Sociology 
Cancel culture, boycotting and ostracism calling out offensive behavior on social media or in real life

Technology and science 
Cancel leaf, a bibliographic term for replaced leaves in printed books
Cancellation property, the mathematical property if a×b = a×c then b = c
Cancelling out, a technique for simplifying mathematical expressions
Catastrophic cancellation, numerical error arising from subtracting approximations to nearby numbers
Noise cancellation, a method for reducing unwanted sound
Phase cancellation, the effect of two waves that are out of phase with each other being summed
Cancel message, a special message used to remove Usenet articles posted to news servers
Cancel character, an indication that transmitted data are in error or are to be disregarded
Resolution rule, in propositional logic a valid inference rule that produces a new clause by two clauses containing complementary literals.
Cancellable (linguistics), a property of implicatures and presuppositions

Entertainment 
Cancellation (television), the termination of a television series
"Cancelled" (South Park), a 2003 episode of the TV series South Park
"Canceled" (Nikita), a 2013 episode of Nikita
"Canceled" (song), a 2020 song by Larray

People and characters 
Robinson Cancel (born 1976), baseball catcher 
Rafael Cancel Miranda (born 1930), political activist 
An alternate name for the archangel Camael

Government 
Cancellation of removal, a form of immigration relief available to aliens in the United States who be otherwise inadmissible or deportable
Cancellation of nationality

See also
 Mitigation
 Nullification (disambiguation)